Amycterini is a tribe of beetles in the subfamily Cyclominae.

Genera 
Acantholophus - Acherres - Achorostoma - Aedriodes - Alexirhea - Amorphorhinus - Amycterus - Anascoptes - Antalaurinus - Atychoria - Brachyrothus - Chriotyphus - Cubicorhynchus - Cucullothorax - Dialeptopus - Dicherotropis - Ennothus - Euomella - Euomus - Gagatophorus - Hyborrhinus - Hypotomops - Lataurinus - Melanegis - Molochtus - Myotrotus - Mythites - Neohyborrhynchus - Notonophes - Oditesus - Ophthalamycterus - Parahyborrhynchus - Pseudonotonophes - Sclerorinus - Sclerorrhinella - Sosytelus - Talaurinellus - Talaurinus - Tetralophus - Xenommamycterus

References 

 Ferguson, E.W. 1912: Revision of the Amycterides. Part ii. Talaurinus. Proceedings of the Linnean Society of New South Wales, 37 (1): 83–135, pls. 2–3.
 Ferguson, E.W. 1913: Revision of the Amycterides. Part ii. Talaurinus (continued). Proceedings of the Linnean Society of New South Wales, 38 (2): 340–394.
 Ferguson, E.W. 1915: Notes on the Amycterides in the South Australian Museum, with descriptions of new species. Part II. Transactions of the Royal Society of South Australia, 39: 57–90.
 Ferguson, E.W. 1923: Revision of the Amycterides (Coleoptera). Part VIII. The Euomides. Proceedings of the Linnean Society of New South Wales, 48 (3): 381–435.
 Waterhouse, G.R. 1854: Notes on the species of Amycterus and allied genera, with descriptions of some new species. Transactions of the Entomological Society of London (series 2), 3 (2): 75–80.
 Zimmerman, E.C. 1993: Australian weevils (Coleoptera: Curculionoidea). Volume 3. Nanophyidae, Rhynchophoridae, Erirhinidae, Curculionidae: Amycterinae, literature consulted. CSIRO Publications - Entomological Society of America. Melbourne.  (v. 3)  (set)

External links 

Cyclominae
Beetle tribes